Holly Ruth Walker (born 15 November 1982) is a former member of the New Zealand House of Representatives from 2011 to 2014, as a Green Party list MP. She is deputy Director of The Helen Clark Foundation, and a writer and book reviewer.

Early life
Walker was born in Lower Hutt in 1982. She was raised by a mother on the Domestic Purposes Benefit and attended Waterloo School, Hutt Intermediate School and Hutt Valley High School, where she was deputy head girl.

University and early political work
From 2001 she studied at the University of Otago, graduating with a BA (Hons) in English and Politics, as well as winning a Blue for her achievements with the Otago University Debating Society. In 2005 she was the editor of student magazine Critic Te Arohi, the year's winner of the Aotearoa Student Press Association's award for Best Student Publication. In September 2005 Critic's annual "Offensive Issue" included a fictional diary of a man who used drugs to stupefy and rape women. The Office of Film and Literature Classification banned the issue in early 2006, after Walker's tenure as editor had ended. At the time of the ban she said the article was "defendable in that it highlights a very important issue", but when Critic interviewed her in 2012 she called it "a mistake to publish that particular article the way that we did".

She moved from Dunedin to Wellington and in 2006 began working as a media adviser to the Green Party. The next year she moved to the Office of Treaty Settlements, working as an analyst. 2007 also saw her named a Rhodes scholar, leading to a master's degree in Developmental Studies from the University of Oxford, awarded in 2007.

After two years in Oxford, Walker returned to New Zealand and the Green Party. She spent 2009-11 as a Political and Media Adviser to the party's MPs, leading a poverty research project for the party, and she co-convened the Young Greens of Aotearoa in 2010.

Member of Parliament

She gave her maiden speech in February 2012.

On 5 April 2012, Walker's Lobbying Disclosure Bill was drawn from the ballot of private members' bills and introduced to Parliament. It had originally been written by Sue Kedgley, but was narrowed in scope under Walker. The bill was modelled on a Canadian law, with similar legislation in Australia and America also being an influence. Its intention was to make interactions between MPs and lobbyists more transparent. It passed its first reading but was rejected by a parliamentary select committee in August 2013.

In January 2013 Walker unveiled the Green Party's Home for Life scheme, aimed at getting low income earners into their own homes. By the end of the Parliamentary term she was Green Party spokesperson for Housing, Electoral Reform, Children, Open Government, Arts Culture & Heritage, and Students.

Three months before the 2014 general election, Walker withdrew from the Green Party list, citing "a recent unexpected change in my family life". She had been placed twelfth - high enough to be returned to Parliament. She remained the party's (unsuccessful) candidate for Hutt South, campaigning only for the party vote, and has not ruled out a return to politics.

Career after politics
After stepping down as a Green MP, Walker worked at the Office of the Children's Commissioner, and began a blog reviewing books written by women. She has written that she wishes to return to public life when family commitments allow her to:

In 2015 she first contributed to website The Spinoff, reviewing books, interviewing authors, and writing other articles. In 2016 she launched a parenting podcast, Dear Mamas, co-hosted with Emily Writes, and contributed book reviews to Radio New Zealand's Nine to Noon programme.

, she is deputy executive director of The Helen Clark Foundation.

The Whole Intimate Mess 
Walker's first book, The Whole Intimate Mess: Motherhood, Politics, and Women's Writing, was launched in June 2017. It describes her experiences while trying to combine motherhood and her career as an MP, including post-natal depression and instances of intentional self-injury.

Family life
Walker is in a civil union with David Haines. They live in Petone with their 2 daughters.

References

External links

 Personal website
Profile on the Green Party website (archived)

1982 births
Living people
Green Party of Aotearoa New Zealand MPs
New Zealand list MPs
New Zealand Rhodes Scholars
Women members of the New Zealand House of Representatives
University of Otago alumni
Alumni of University College, Oxford
People from Lower Hutt
People educated at Hutt Valley High School
Members of the New Zealand House of Representatives
Unsuccessful candidates in the 2014 New Zealand general election
21st-century New Zealand politicians
21st-century New Zealand women politicians